The Wisconsin Badgers football program represents the University of Wisconsin–Madison in the sport of American football. Wisconsin competes in the Football Bowl Subdivision (FBS) of the National Collegiate Athletic Association (NCAA) and the West Division of the Big Ten Conference (Big Ten). The Badgers have competed in the Big Ten since its formation in 1896. They play their home games at Camp Randall Stadium, the fourth-oldest stadium in college football. Wisconsin is one of 26 College football programs to win 700 or more games. The program has been one of the most successful programs since the 1990’s. Wisconsin has had two Heisman Trophy winners, Alan Ameche and Ron Dayne, and has had eleven former players inducted into the College Football Hall of Fame.

History

Team name origin
The team's nickname originates in the early history of Wisconsin. In the 1820s and 1830s, prospectors came to the state looking for minerals, primarily lead. Without shelter in the winter, the miners had to "live like badgers" in tunnels burrowed into hillsides.

The early years (1889–1912)

The first Badger football team took the field in 1889, losing the only two games it played that season. In 1890, Wisconsin earned its first victory with a 106–0 drubbing of Whitewater Normal School (now the University of Wisconsin–Whitewater), still the most lopsided win in school history.  However, the very next week the Badgers suffered what remains their most lopsided defeat, a humiliating 63–0 loss at the hands of the University of Minnesota. Since then, the Badgers and Gophers have met 127 times, making Wisconsin vs Minnesota the most-played rivalry in the Football Bowl Subdivision.

Upon the formation of the Big Ten conference in 1896, Wisconsin became the first-ever conference champion with a 7–1–1 record. Over the next ten years, the Badgers won or shared the conference title three more times (1897, 1901, and 1906), and recorded their first undefeated season, going 9–0–0 (1901). With the exception of their second undefeated season in 1912, in which they won their fifth Big Ten title.

Moderate successes  (1913–1941)

The 1912 season would be their last conference title until 1952. The team posted mostly winning seasons over the next several seasons however.

The climb back to dominance (1942–1962)

1942 was an important year for Wisconsin football. On October 24, the No. 6 ranked Badgers defeated the No. 1 ranked Ohio State Buckeyes at Camp Randall, catapulting Wisconsin to the No. 2 spot in the AP poll. Unfortunately for the Badgers, their national championship hopes were dashed in a 6–0 defeat by the Iowa Hawkeyes the following week. Nevertheless, Wisconsin won the remainder of its games, finishing the season 8–1–1 and No. 3 in the AP, while garnering the Helms Athletic Foundation vote for National Champion, giving the program its only National Championship to date (the AP National Champions were the Ohio State Buckeyes, whom Wisconsin beat during the season). Afterwards, the Badgers struggled to regain their momentum, with their efforts hampered by many of their star players leaving as a result of World War II. In the late 1940s, fans began insisting that head coach Harry Stuhldreher resign, many times chanting "Goodbye Harry", especially during 1948, where the Badgers finished 2–7. Stuhldreher stepped down as head coach, while keeping his duties as athletic director. Stuhldreher then named Ivy Williamson as head coach

The Badgers experienced great success during the 1950s under Williamson, finishing in the AP Top 25 eight times that decade. In one stretch, from 1950 to 1954, the Badgers went 26-8-3. The Badgers' success during those seasons was defined by a stout defense, dubbed "The Hard Rocks", which usually finished in the top 5 of the nation in overall defense, including leading the nation in 1951. In 1952, the team received its first No. 1 ranking by the Associated Press. That season, the Badgers again claimed the Big Ten title and earned their first trip to the Rose Bowl. There they were defeated 7–0 by the Southern California, and would finish the season ranked No. 11 in the AP. In 1954 after a 7–2 season, Wisconsin's Alan Ameche became the first Badger to win the Heisman Trophy. Ivy Williamson stepped down as head coach in 1955 to become athletic director, and was replaced by his former assistant coach, Milt Bruhn. Bruhn would continue Wisconsin's success, after an initial setback with a 1-5-3 record in 1956. Wisconsin returned to the Rose Bowl as Big Ten Champions in 1959, but fell to the Washington Huskies, 44–8.

Continuing under the direction of Bruhn in 1962, the Badgers had another landmark season, spearheaded by the passing combination of Ron Vander Kelen to All-American Pat Richter. The Badgers standout victory was an upset of No. 1-ranked Northwestern, who were coached then by the legendary Ara Parseghian. The Badgers finished 8–1, earned their eighth Big Ten title, and faced the top-ranked USC Trojans in the Rose Bowl. Despite a narrow 42–37 defeat, the Badgers still ended the season ranked No. 2 in both the AP and Coaches polls (post-bowl rankings were not introduced until later in the decade).

Limited successes (1963–1989)
Following the successful 1962 campaign, Wisconsin football scuffled, and Milt Bruhn resigned in 1966 after three straight losing seasons. Wisconsin chose former assistant coach John Coatta as Bruhn's replacement. The Badgers finished even worse under Coatta, going winless for 23 straight games from 1967 to 1969, and winning only 3 games overall during Coatta's short reign, each of the wins occurring during the 1969 season. What stung even worse for Badger fans during the three season, was the coach that Wisconsin supposedly turned down for the head coaching role, Bo Schembechler, who would become a coaching legend at Michigan.

In 1970, new athletic director Elroy Hirsch named John Jardine as head coach. While the Badgers weren't a consistent winner under Jardine, the program regained stability, and also brought excitement in running backs Rufus "Roadrunner" Ferguson and Billy Marek. The Badgers went 37-47-3 under Jardine, who stepped down in 1977.

After more subpar seasons from 1978 to 1980, the team had a string of seven-win seasons from 1981 to 1984 under Dave McClain. During that time the Badgers played in the Garden State Bowl (1981), Independence Bowl (1982), and Hall of Fame Classic Bowl (1984).  McClain's death during spring practice in 1986 sent the Badgers into free fall.  From 1986 to 1990, the Badgers won a total of nine games.

Barry Alvarez era, "From Red Ink to Roses" (1990–2005)

By the end of the 1989 season, the Wisconsin football program was in disarray, shouldering a debt of over $2 million and with only 30,000 fans attending games at the 77,000-capacity stadium. New athletic director Pat Richter named Barry Alvarez, the defensive coordinator at Notre Dame, as the new head coach. To bring stability and interest to the program again, Alvarez targeted the top high school players in Wisconsin, "building a wall" around the state, and also encouraged players not recruited to join the program as walk-ons. Though Alvarez won his first game as head coach over Ball State, the Badgers finished 1–10 in 1990. The Badgers finished 5–6 in the next two seasons, but there were encouraging signs for the future. Wisconsin was in bowl contention on the last day of the 1992 season, but a narrow loss to Northwestern kept them from going to a bowl.

Everything finally came together for the Badgers in 1993. They steamrolled through the season, finishing 10-1-1, winning their first Big Ten championship since 1962 and beating UCLA 21–16 to claim their first Rose Bowl victory.

After the surprise success of 1993, the Badgers fell back into mediocrity, though remaining competitive, going 2–1 in bowl games from 1994 to 1997, with victories in the Hall of Fame Bowl in 1994, and the Copper Bowl in 1996. Alvarez retooled the team with a new batch of talented recruits during this stretch of seasons, and they came to full fruition in 1998 and 1999. Among the standouts were cornerback Jamar Fletcher, wide receiver Chris Chambers, quarterback Brooks Bollinger, offensive linemen Aaron Gibson, Chris McIntosh, and Mark Tauscher, and running back Ron Dayne. With "The Great Dayne" leading the way, the Badgers won back-to-back Big Ten championships and back-to-back Rose Bowls over UCLA in 1999 and Stanford in 2000. The 1998 team won a school-record 11 games, while the 1999 team won its first outright Big Ten title since 1962. Ron Dayne set a new NCAA record for career rushing yardage, and won the Heisman Trophy in 1999.

In 2000, there were hopes of the Badgers winning their third consecutive Big Ten championship and an unprecedented three straight Rose Bowls. However early in the season, Wisconsin's football and basketball programs were hit with "The Shoe Box scandal", when a local shoe store gave university athletes discounts on footwear. Wisconsin athletic programs were put on five years of probation and several players were suspended by the NCAA. The Badgers finished 9–4, with a victory over UCLA in the Sun Bowl.

Due to the loss of scholarships as a result of the NCAA investigation, the Badgers struggled through the 2001–2003 seasons, never finishing higher than seventh in the Big Ten. The Badgers returned to the top 20 in the AP polls in 2004 and 2005, with a victory in the Capitol One Bowl in 2005. In 2004, Alvarez was named athletic director, replacing the retiring Pat Richter. The strain of holding both roles became too much for Alvarez, and he stepped down as head coach after the 2005 season.

Alvarez coached the Badgers for 16 seasons, finishing with a 118-73-4 record, three times finishing in the Top 10 in the AP polls, and the only Big Ten head coach to win back-to-back Rose Bowls.

Bret Bielema era (2006–2012)
Following the 2005 season, Alvarez resigned as head coach in order to focus on his duties as athletic director, a position he had assumed in 2004.  He named his defensive coordinator, Bret Bielema, as his successor. Wisconsin's 2006 team went 12-1 and won the Capital One Bowl over Arkansas 17–14. Wisconsin finished the season ranked 5th in coaches poll and 7th in the AP Poll. From 2006 to 2011, Bielema led the Badgers to six consecutive bowl appearances, going 2–4. In 2010, the Badgers won a share of the Big Ten Championship and returned to the Rose Bowl for the first time since 2000.  There they were defeated 21–19 by the No. 3 ranked TCU Horned Frogs.  In 2011, the Badgers were once again crowned Big Ten Champs when they defeated Michigan State in the first-ever conference championship game. The victory sent Wisconsin back to the Rose Bowl for a second consecutive year, where they were defeated by the Pac-12 champion Oregon Ducks, 45–38.

The 2012 season ended with the Badgers winning a third consecutive Big Ten title.  Despite finishing with a 7–5 record and third in the Leaders Division, the Badgers advanced to the Big Ten Championship game by virtue of the fact that Penn State and Ohio State were ineligible for postseason play.  A dominating rushing performance led Wisconsin to a 70–31 victory over No. 12 ranked Nebraska in the Big Ten Championship game.  Only days later, Bret Bielema resigned to become the head coach of the Arkansas Razorbacks. Gary Andersen, formerly coach of Utah State University, was named head coach on December 19, 2012.  At the request of the team captains, Barry Alvarez named himself interim coach for the 2013 Rose Bowl, where the Badgers lost, 20–14 to Stanford. Bret Bielema finished his coaching career at Wisconsin with a 68–24 record a 74 percent winning percentage 3 top 10 finishes 6 top 25 finishes 3 Big ten titles and 7 straight winning seasons won ten or more games 4 out of 7 years.

Gary Andersen era (2013–2014)
Gary Andersen was hired in December 2012 after Bret Bielema resigned to become the head coach for the University of Arkansas. Andersen was previously the head coach for Utah State where he went 26–23 in his four years at Utah State with his last season being 11-2 and finishing first in the Western Athletic Conference. Andersen's first win as the Badgers coach was a 45–0 win against Massachusetts. His first Big Ten football victory was a 41–10 victory over Purdue. The Badgers ended 2013 with a 9–4 record after losing to No. 8 South Carolina Gamecocks in the Capital One Bowl.

The Badgers started out the 2014 season ranked No. 14 in the AP Poll and their season opener was against No. 13 LSU Tigers in Houston, after leading the Tigers through three quarters the Tigers came back from a 24–7 deficit to defeat the Badgers 28–24. The Badgers recorded their first road shutout since 1998 in a 37–0 victory over the Big Ten newcomers Rutgers Scarlet Knights. On November 15, junior running back Melvin Gordon broke the all-time FBS single-game rushing yards record with 408 yards in a 59–24 victory against the Nebraska Cornhuskers. However that record only lasted a week as Samaje Perine from Oklahoma rushed for 427 yards the very next week. The 2014 regular season ended with the Badgers taking 1st place in the West Division with a 10–2 record. Wisconsin played Ohio State for the conference title in the 2014 Big Ten Championship Game where the Badgers lost to Ohio State 59–0. It was the first time since 1997 that the Badgers were shutout and the worst loss since 1979 when Ohio State defeated the Badgers 59–0.

Andersen departed Wisconsin four days later, taking the vacant head coaching position at Oregon State. Andersen cited family as his rationale for taking the Oregon State position; however, it was reported by some media outlets, such as Fox Sports and Sports Illustrated, that Andersen was frustrated with the University's high academic standards for athletes.  Those reports turned out to be accurate, and were confirmed by Andersen in January 2015. Andersen had to pay a $3 million buyout for departing within the first two years of his contract, which was set through January 2019. At the request of the teams' seniors, Barry Alvarez named himself interim coach for the 2015 Outback Bowl vs. Auburn on January 1, 2015. Wisconsin won the game 34–31 in overtime. Gary Andersen finished his coaching career at Wisconsin with a 19–7 record a 73 percent winning percentage with one Big Ten west division title.

Paul Chryst Era (2015–2022)

After the departure of Gary Andersen, former Badgers offensive coordinator (2005-2011) and Pitt head coach (2012-2014) Paul Chryst, was hired as the next head coach of the Wisconsin Badgers. The only assistant coach to remain on the coaching staff after Andersen's departure was defensive coordinator Dave Aranda. Chryst brought over six coaching staff from the University of Pittsburgh, Joe Rudolph (OC), John Settle (RB coach), Inoke Breckterfield (D-line), Chris Haering (special teams), Mickey Turner (TE coach) and Ross Kolodziej (strength and conditioning). From 2005 to 2011 Rudolph (TE coach) and Settle (RB coach) were assistant coaches under Chryst (OC). Mickey Turner and Ross Kolodziej are both former Badgers players, Turner was a tight end from 2006 to 2009 and Kolodziej was a defensive tackle from 1997 to 2000.

2015 season
In Chryst's first season the Badgers went 10–3, finished the season ranked 20th in the nation, and finished 1st nationally in scoring defense (13.7 points per game) and 2nd in total defense (268.5 yards per game). All three losses came to teams that were in the AP top 25 at the end of the season, eventual national champions No. 1 Alabama, No. 9 Iowa and No. 23 Northwestern. Chryst also won the Holiday Bowl against USC, whom the Badgers had a 0–6 record against before the game, with their last meeting being the 1963 Rose Bowl. Two days after their victory over USC it was announced that the Badgers defensive coordinator, Dave Aranda, would be taking the same role for the LSU Tigers, whom the Badgers opened the 2016 season against at Lambeau Field.

2016 season
Aranda was replaced with Justin Wilcox, who was previously USC's defensive coordinator from 2014 to 2015, he was fired in early December 2015 after the Trojans finished 50th nationally in scoring defense (25.7 points per game) and 65th in total defense (400.8 yards per game). The Badgers started 2016 on a high note by upsetting the No. 5 ranked LSU Tigers 16–14 in their season opener at Lambeau Field, the first ever major college football game in the historical stadium. The Badgers stayed in the AP top 10 for most of the season, with two losses to Michigan and Ohio State. Wisconsin lost the Big 10 championship game to Penn State, then won the 2017 Cotton Bowl Classic over Western Michigan to finish 11–3, finishing the season ranked 8th in the nation. After the season, Wilcox left to take the head coaching job at Cal.

2017 season
Wisconsin came into the 2017 season ranked No. 9 in the AP poll and was ranked in the top 10 all season. Undefeated during the regular season, the Badgers were ranked fourth in the nation before narrowly losing the Big 10 championship to Ohio State. Despite failing to reach the College Football Playoff, the Badgers rebounded to win the 2017 Orange Bowl over Miami to finish the season with a 13–1 record, their best record since the 2007 season. Wisconsin was ranked as high as 3rd in the nation in week 14 in the AP poll and Coaches poll and received 10 first-place votes in the AP poll and 21 first-place votes in the Coaches poll. Wisconsin finished the season ranked 6th in the nation.

2018 season
There were high expectations the next season as Wisconsin came into the 2018 campaign ranked No. 4 in the AP poll. However, injuries and inexperience, alongside poor quarterback play, derailed a promising season as the Badgers finished with a 7-5 regular-season record, including a loss to Minnesota, which resulted in Wisconsin losing Paul Bunyan's Axe for the first time since the 2003 season. The Badgers finished the season with a win in a rematch against Miami in the 2018 Pinstripe Bowl to finish 8–5.

2019 season
Wisconsin came into the 2019 season ranked No. 19 in the AP Poll and shut out 4 teams en route to a 10-2 finish in the regular season and won the Big Ten West, including games vs ranked Iowa, Michigan and Minnesota and were ranked No. 8 in the AP Poll going in the Big Ten Championship vs No. 1 Ohio State. Despite leading 21–7 at halftime, they ended up losing 34-21 and ended the season with a 28–27 loss vs Oregon in the Rose Bowl. Wisconsin finished the season ranked 10th in the nation.

2020 season
The 2020 season was shortened and suffered setbacks as a result of the COVID-19 pandemic. The Big Ten, like most conferences, decided to cancel all non-conference games and play a shortened conference-only schedule. The Badgers also suffered from coronavirus-related postponements against Nebraska, Purdue, and Minnesota. As a result, the Nebraska and Purdue games were canceled. Wisconsin struggled to a 4-3 record, losing three games in a row to ranked opponents before finishing the season with a 20-17 overtime victory over Minnesota. The Badgers were invited to the Duke's Mayo Bowl against Wake Forest and won 42-28.

2021 season
In 2021, the Badgers sought to rebound from their worst season of the Chryst era. However, Wisconsin started out cold, losing three of their first four games. Chryst's squad suffered home losses to Penn State and Michigan along with a road loss to Notre Dame, all ranked opponents. However, the Badgers would recover and win their next seven games including a 27-7 victory over the then-No. 9 Iowa Hawkeyes. The Badgers lost Paul Bunyan's Axe to Minnesota before beating Arizona State in the Las Vegas Bowl 20-13, finishing the season with a 9-4 record and a 6-3 conference record. For the first time in the Chryst era, the Badgers finished consecutive seasons unranked in the AP or CFP polls.

2022 season
Wisconsin started strong with a blowout win over Illinois State in the season opener, but after a lagging offense and a struggling defense led to a blowout loss at Ohio State and embarrassing defeats at home to Washington State and Illinois, Paul Chryst was fired on October 2nd, two days after former Badgers coach Bret Bielema led the Illini to their first win in Madison since 2002. Defensive Coordinator Jim Leonhard became the interim coach and went 4-3 overall to finish the season 6-6, keeping Wisconsin's bowl streak alive.On December 27 Wisconsin beat Oklahoma State 24-17 in the Guaranteed Rate Bowl it was their 8th bowl win in their last 9 bowl games, and it made Wisconsin finish 7-6 their 22nd straight winning season. It was initially thought that Leonhard would become the permanent replacement for Chryst but after a loss at home to Minnesota, which was the first time the Badgers had lost consecutive games to their rival since 1993-94, it was decided that former Ohio State coordinator and University of Cincinnati coach Luke Fickell would be the next coach of the program.

Luke Fickell Era (Beginning in 2023)
On November 27, 2022 Luke Fickell was announced as the 31st head football coach for the Wisconsin Badgers.

Conference affiliations
 Independent (1889–1895)
 Big Ten Conference (1896–present)

Championships

National championships
Wisconsin has one national championship from an NCAA-designated major selector for the 1942 season. However, the school does not claim this championship.

Conference championships
Wisconsin has won 14 conference championships, eight outright and six shared.

† Co-champions

Division championships
Wisconsin has won 5 division championships.

Bowl games

The Badgers have appeared in 34 bowl games and have a record of 19 wins and 15 losses (19-15). Their most recent bowl game was in the 2022 Guaranteed Rate Bowl. The Badgers have participated in a season-ending bowl game 21 consecutive seasons and snapped a four-game bowl losing streak with a 34–31 overtime victory over Auburn in the 2015 Outback Bowl. They have won eight of the last nine bowl games, with Paul Chryst having won the first four bowls his team participated in and then falling one-point short in the 2020 Rose Bowl. The Badgers have participated in a season-ending bowl game 21 consecutive seasons, the third longest bowl streak in the country only behind Georgia and Oklahoma.

Head coaches

Luke Fickell is now Wisconsin's head coach.

Rivalries

Minnesota

The UW-U of M series is the nation's most-played rivalry in Division I FBS football and has been played continuously since 1907. Much prestige was always associated with the game, and its significance was emphasized with its place on the schedule. Between 1933 and 1982, the Wisconsin-Minnesota game was always the final regular-season contest for each school. The series took an added twist in 1948 when more than state bragging rights were on the line. After a 16-0 setback that season, the Wisconsin lettermen's group, the National 'W' Club, presented Minnesota with an axe wielded by Paul Bunyan. He was the mythical giant of Midwestern lumber camps. Each year since, the winner of the annual battle between the Big Ten rivals is presented with the axe, complete with scores inscribed on the handle, for display on its campus. The series is tied at 62-62-8.

Iowa

Iowa is Wisconsin's other archrival. Although the rivalry started in 1894, the Heartland Trophy was inaugurated in 2004 and goes each year to the winner. The trophy was designed and crafted by artist and former Iowa football player Frank Strub. The trophy, which is a bull mounted on a walnut base (native to both Wisconsin and Iowa), has been inscribed with the scores of all games in the long-time series. With Big Ten expansion, the Wisconsin and Iowa football teams were placed in separate divisions, thus ending their annual rivalry. However, with the addition of Maryland and Rutgers, Iowa and Wisconsin were placed back in the same division in 2014. Wisconsin leads the series at 49-45-2.

Nebraska

Nebraska is Wisconsin's newest rival. With the inclusion of the Cornhuskers in the Big Ten in 2011 the first three games between the two programs were significant, the third being the 2012 Big Ten Football Championship Game where the unranked Badgers defeated the heavily favored No. 14 ranked Cornhuskers, 70–31. Prior to their next matchup in 2014, the University of Nebraska and the University of Wisconsin announced that moving forward the two schools would play for the Freedom Trophy. The trophy sits on a wooden base and features a depiction of Nebraska's Memorial Stadium on one side and Wisconsin's Camp Randall Stadium on the other.  The trophy has an inscription honoring the nation's veterans and symbolizes that Memorial Stadium was built in their honor at Nebraska while Camp Randall Stadium in Wisconsin was built on the site of a former Civil War training site.  The score of each year's contest is inscribed on the trophy. Wisconsin leads the overall series 12-4-0.

All-time records

All-time Big Ten records
This chart includes both the overall record the University of Wisconsin Badgers have with the all-time Big Ten members, as well as the matchups that counted in the Big Ten standings.  Wisconsin has been a member of the Big Ten since its creation in 1896.  Michigan rejoined the league in 1917 after leaving in 1906.  Chicago withdrew after 1939, and then Michigan State (1953), Penn State (1993), and Nebraska (2011), Maryland and Rutgers (2014) joined the Big Ten conference bringing the league total to 14 teams.
(As of November 24, 2018)

All Data from The Wisconsin Football Fact Book

Traditions

The Fifth Quarter
The Fifth Quarter is a fan event that originated in 1969 and takes place following every Wisconsin home football game. During a 24-game losing streak (the longest in the schools history), athletic director Elroy Hirsch worked with the Wisconsin school band to create "the Fifth Quarter", where the band plays fan favorites such as "On, Wisconsin", "You’ve Said it All", and, at the end of the Fifth Quarter, "Varsity", the school's alma mater.

Jump Around

At home football games at the University of Wisconsin–Madison, students "Jump Around" to the song between the third and fourth quarters. The tradition grew out of the men's varsity swim team members playing it over a portable CD player and broadcasting via a smuggled-in megaphone to sections O and P during the games to rile up those sections. This began in 1992, well before the official start. In March 1997, at a Fraternity party at Delta Tau Delta at midnight the song was played with the football team and members of the future stadium employees and it became the midnight anthem for every party until the end of that year. The tradition "officially" began on Saturday, October 10, 1998, at the Badgers Homecoming game against the Purdue Boilermakers. During a game in which no offensive points were scored in the third quarter, and with the Badgers en route to their second 6–0 start in the modern football era, a team official piped the song through the loudspeakers. It stirred up fans and players and eventually became a tradition.

On September 6, 2003 (the Badgers' first home game of the season), with the construction of skyboxes surrounding Camp Randall Stadium, UW officials decided to cancel the "Jump Around" due to worries about structural integrity. Stadium security and the local police department had been informed of this decision but no notification had been given to the fans. When news surfaced on Monday, September 8, that this event was not a technical or human malfunction, but rather a decision by campus officials, the students launched a protest. Petitions circulated and students pushed back against administration. Structural engineers confirmed that the stadium would suffer no structural damage caused by the vibrations created by jumping. Two days later, Chancellor John D. Wiley announced that the "Jump Around" tradition would resume. The song's title is displayed on unofficial Wisconsin Badgers clothing and apparel, along with the credit/debit cards of the university's employee/student/alumni credit union.

College GameDay

The Badgers have appeared on ESPN's College Game Day 18 times since 1999, with 3 bowl appearances. Wisconsin is 7–11 in games played when College GameDay has traveled to Badger games. Wisconsin has hosted the program 7 times. The most recent visit came in 2021 when UW played Notre Dame in Chicago. The Badgers have a 4–3 record when GameDay is on the Madison campus.

Individual school records
Note ‡-indicates NCAA FBS Record, †-indicates Big Ten Conference Record

All Data from The 2019 Wisconsin Football Fact Book

Rushing records

 Most rushing attempts, career: 1220, Ron Dayne (1996–99)
 Most rushing attempts, season: 356, Montee Ball (2012)
 Most rushing attempts, game: 50, Ron Dayne (November 9, 1996, vs. Minnesota)
 Most rushing yards, career: 7,125, Ron Dayne (1996–99)‡†
 Most rushing yards, season: 2,587, Melvin Gordon (2014)†
 Most rushing yards, game: 408, Melvin Gordon (November 15, 2014, vs. Nebraska)†
 Most rushing yards, single quarter: 189, Melvin Gordon  (November 15, 2014, vs. Nebraska)
 Highest average yard per carry, career (min 300 att.): 7.8, Melvin Gordon (2011–14)
 Highest average yard per carry, season (min 100 att.): 7.81, Melvin Gordon (2013)
 Highest average yard per carry, game (min 10 att.): 19.5, Melvin Gordon (September 20, 2014, vs. Bowling Green)
 Most rushing touchdowns, career: 77, Montee Ball (2009-2012)†
 Most rushing touchdowns, season: 33, Montee Ball (2011)‡†
 Most rushing touchdowns, game: 5
Billy Marek (November 23, 1974, vs. Minnesota)
Anthony Davis (November 23, 2002, vs. Minnesota)
Brian Calhoun (September 3, 2005, vs. Bowling Green)
Brian Calhoun (October 29, 2005, vs. Illinois)
Melvin Gordon (September 20, 2014, vs. Bowling Green)
 Most games with at least 100 rushing yards, career: 33, Ron Dayne (1996–99)
 Most games with at least 100 rushing yards, season: 12, Melvin Gordon (2014)
 Most games with at least 200 rushing yards, career: 12, Jonathan Taylor (2017–19)
 Most games with at least 200 rushing yards, season: 6, Melvin Gordon (2014)

Passing records

 Most passing attempts, career: 1,052, Darrell Bevell (1992–95)
 Most passing attempts, season: 333, Tyler Donovan (2007)
 Most passing attempts, game: 54, Randy Wright (November 5, 1983, vs. Iowa)
 Most passing completions, career: 646, Darrell Bevell (1992–95)
 Most passing completions, season: 225, Russell Wilson (2011)
 Most passing completions, game: 35, Darrell Bevell (November 18, 1995, vs. Iowa)
 Most passing yards, career: 7,686, Darrell Bevell (1992–95)
 Most passing yards, season: 3,175, Russell Wilson (2011)
 Most passing yards, game: 423, Darrell Bevell (October 23, 1993, vs. Minnesota)
 Highest completion percentage, career: 68.1 (410–602), Scott Tolzien (2008–10)
 Highest completion percentage, season: 72.9 (194–266), Scott Tolzien (2010)
 Highest completion percentage, game (min 10 att.): 95.2 (20–21), Graham Mertz (October 23, 2020, vs. Illinois)
 Most passing touchdowns, career: 59, Darrell Bevell (1992–95)
 Most passing touchdowns, season: 33, Russell Wilson (2011)
 Most passing touchdowns, game: 5, Darrell Bevell (September 4, 1993, vs. Nevada), Jim Sorgi (November 15, 2003, vs. Michigan State), and Graham Mertz (October 23, 2020, vs Illinois)
 Highest pass efficiency rating, career: 191.8, Russell Wilson (2011)‡†
 Highest pass efficiency rating, season: 191.8, Russell Wilson (2011)‡†
 Highest pass efficiency rating, game (min 15 att.): 296.68, John Stocco (September 30, 2006, vs. Indiana)
 Most games with at least 200 passing yards, career: 17, John Stocco (2003–06)
 Most games with at least 200 passing yards, season: 8, John Stocco (2005), Russell Wilson (2011)

Receiving records

 Most receptions, career: 202, Brandon Williams (2002–05) and Jared Abbrederis (2009–13)
 Most receptions, season: 78, Jared Abbrederis (2013)
 Most receptions, game: 13, Matt Nyquist (November 18, 1995, vs. Iowa)
 Most receiving yards, career: 3,468, Lee Evans (1999–2003)
 Most receiving yards, season: 1,545, Lee Evans (2001)
 Most receiving yards, game: 258, Lee Evans (November 15, 2003, vs. Michigan State)
 Highest average yards per reception, career (min 50 rec.): 20.1, Tony Simmons (1994–97)
 Highest average yards per reception, season (min 30 rec.): 21.3, Larry Mialik (1970)
 Highest average yards per reception, game (min 3 rec.): 47.3, Larry Mialik (October 3, 1970, vs. Penn State Nittany Lions)
 Most touchdown receptions, career: 27, Lee Evans (1999–2003)
 Most touchdown receptions, season: 13, Lee Evans (2003)
 Most touchdown receptions, game: 5, Lee Evans (November 15, 2003, vs. Michigan State Spartans)
 Most consecutive games with a reception, career: 38, Lee Evans (1999–2003)

Scoring records

 Most points scored, career: 500, Montee Ball (2009–2012)‡†
 Most points scored, season: 236, Montee Ball (2011)‡†
 Most points scored, game: 30
 Billy Marek (November 23, 1974, vs. Minnesota)
 Anthony Davis (November 23, 2002, vs. Minnesota)
 Lee Evans (November 15, 2003, vs. Michigan State)
 Brian Calhoun (September 3, 2005, vs. Bowling Green and October 29, 2005, vs. Illinois)
 P.J. Hill (September 15, 2007, vs. The Citadel)
 Melvin Gordon (September 20, 2014, vs. Bowling Green)
 Most touchdowns scored, career: 83, Montee Ball (2009–2012)‡†
 Most touchdowns scored, season: 39, Montee Ball (2011)‡†
 Most touchdowns scored, game: 5
 Billy Marek (November 23, 1974, vs. Minnesota)
 Anthony Davis (November 23, 2002, vs. Minnesota)
 Lee Evans (November 15, 2003, vs. Michigan State)
 Brian Calhoun (September 3, 2005, vs. Bowling Green and October 29, 2005, vs. Illinois)
 P.J. Hill (September 15, 2007, vs. The Citadel)
 Melvin Gordon (September 20, 2014, vs. Bowling Green)
 Most extra points, career: 202, Philip Welch (2008–11)
 Most extra points, season: 67, Philip Welch (2010)
 Most extra points, game: 11, Philip Welch (November 13, 2010, vs. Indiana)
 Most field goals made, career: 65, Todd Gregoire (1984–87)
 Most field goals made, season: 22, Rich Thompson (1992)
 Most field goals made, game: 4
 Vince Lamia (November 20, 1976, vs. Minnesota)
 Todd Gregoire (December 29, 1984, vs. Kentucky and November 7, 1987, vs. Ohio State)
 Rich Thompson (September 19, 1992, vs. Bowling Green and October 17, 1992, vs. Purdue)
 Matt Davenport (November 7, 1998, vs. Minnesota)
 Vitaly Pisetsky (October 23, 1999, vs. Michigan State)
 Philip Welch (September 27, 2008, vs. Michigan)

Kickoff/Punt return records
 Most kickoff return yards, career: 3,025, David Gilreath (2007–10)
 Most kickoff return yards, season: 967, David Gilreath (2007)
 Most kickoff return yards, game: 201, Jared Abbrederis (January 2, 2012, vs. Oregon)
 Most kickoff return touchdowns, career: 2, Danny Crooks (1969–71), Ira Matthews (1975–78), and Nick Davis (1998–2001)
 Most kickoff return touchdowns, season: 2, Ira Matthews (1976) and Nick Davis (1999)
 Most kickoff return touchdowns, game: 1, (multiple players), most recent - Aron Cruickshank (January 1, 2020, vs. (Oregon)
 Highest average per kickoff return, career (min 30 ret.): 25.8, Jared Abbrederis (2010–13)
 Highest average per kickoff return, season (min 10 ret.): 29.6, Ira Matthews (1976)
 Highest average per kickoff return, game (min 3 ret.): 42.7, Selvie Washington (September 21, 1974, vs. Nebraska)
 Most punt return yards, career: 1,347, Jim Leonhard (2001–04)
 Most punt return yards, season: 470, Jim Leonhard (2003)
 Most punt return yards, game: 158, Earl Girard (November 8, 1947, vs. Iowa)
 Most punt return touchdowns, career: 4, Ira Matthews (1975–78)
 Most punt return touchdowns, season: 3, Ira Matthews (1978)
 Most punt return touchdowns, game: 2, Earl Girard (November 8, 1947, vs. Iowa)
 Highest average per punt return, career (min 25 ret.): 13.7, Brandon Williams (2002–05)
 Highest average per punt return, season (min 15 ret.): 16.9, Ira Matthews (1978)
 Highest average per punt return, game (min 3 ret.): 52.7, Earl Girard (November 8, 1947, vs. Iowa)

Defensive records

 Most interceptions, career: 21, Jamar Fletcher (1998–2000) and Jim Leonhard (2001–04)
 Most interceptions, season: 11, Jim Leonhard (2002)
 Most interceptions, game: 4, Clarence Bratt (November 20, 1964, vs. Minnesota)
 Most interceptions returned for a touchdown, career: 5, Jamar Fletcher (1998–2000)
 Most interceptions returned for a touchdown, season: 3, Jamar Fletcher (1998)
 Most interceptions returned for a touchdown, game: 2, Bob Radcliffe (October 15, 1949, vs. Navy)
 Most tackles, career: 451, Pete Monty (1993–96)
 Most tackles, season: 181, Dave Lokanc (1972)
 Most tackles, game: 28, Dave Crossen (November 5, 1977, vs. Purdue)
 Most tackles for loss, career: 58, Tarek Saleh (1993–96)
 Most tackles for loss, season: 31, Tom Burke (1998)
 Most tackles for loss, game: 6.5, Alex Lewis (October 18, 2003, vs. Purdue)
 Most quarterback sacks, career: 33, Tarek Saleh (1993–96)
 Most quarterback sacks, season: 22, Tom Burke (1998)
 Most quarterback sacks, game: 6, Tim Jordan (October 19, 1985, vs. Northwestern)
 Most fumbles forced, career: 14, Chris Borland (2009–13)‡†
 Most fumbles recovered, career: 9, Scott Erdmann (1975–78)
 Most fumbles recovered, season: 5, Ed Bosold (1972)
 Most fumbles recovered, game: 3, Michael Reid (November 16, 1985, vs. Ohio State)
 Most passes defended, career: 62, Mike Echols (1998–2001)
 Most passes defended, season: 25, Mike Echols (2000) and Jim Leonhard (2002)
 Most passes defended, game: 6, Mike Echols (November 6, 1999, vs. Purdue)
 Most blocked kicks, career: 8, Richard Johnson (1982–84)
 Most blocked kicks, season: 6, Richard Johnson (1984)
 Most blocked kicks, game: 3, Richard Johnson (September 15, 1984, vs. Missouri)

Note ‡-indicates NCAA FBS Record, †-indicates Big Ten Conference Record

Honors

Retired numbers

{| class="wikitable sortable" style="text-align:center"
|-
! style="width:40px; ;" | No.
! style="width:100px; ;"| Player
! style="width:80px; ;" | Position
! style= "" |Tenure
|-
| 33 || Ron Dayne || RB || 1996–99
|-
| 35 || Alan Ameche || FB || 1951–54
|-
| 40 || Elroy Hirsch || RB, WR || 1942
|-
| 80 || Dave Schreiner || E || 1939–42
|-
| 83 || Allan Shafer  || QB || 1944 {{refn|Posthumously. Shafer played only six games in 1944 before his death from injuries received in a game on November 11. He was 17 years old.|group=note|name=posth}}
|-
| 88 || Pat Richter || E, WR, P || 1960–62
|}

Notes

Hall of Fame

College Football Hall of Fame
Beginning with George Little and Dave Schreiner in the 1955 class, the Badgers have had 14 former players and coaches inducted into the College Football Hall of Fame

1955 George Little & Dave Schreiner
1962 Phillip King & Pat O'Dea
1972 Bob Butler
1974 Elroy Hirsch
1975 Alan Ameche
1988 Marty Below
1993 Pat Harder
1996 Pat Richter
2010 Barry Alvarez
2013 Ron Dayne
2016 Tim Krumrie
2019 Joe Thomas

Pro Football Hall of Fame
Wisconsin has had 4 former players, graduates enshrined into the Pro Football Hall of Fame.

1966 Arnie Herber
1968 Elroy Hirsch
1997 Mike Webster
2023 Joe Thomas

Individual award winners and finalists
The following players have been nominated for national awards. Players highlighted in yellow indicate winners:

Consensus All-Americans
List of Consensus All-Americans showing the year won, player and position

	

Future opponents

Big Ten West-division opponents
Wisconsin plays the other six Big Ten West opponents once per season.

Future Big Ten East-division opponents

Non-conference opponents
Announced schedules as of June 16, 2022.

On August 12, 2020, it was announced that Wisconsin would play versus the Southern Illinois Salukis in 2027, a game rescheduled from 2020 due to the COVID-19 pandemic.

On January 8, 2021, it was announced that Wisconsin would play versus the Colorado State Rams in 2026.  On May 4, 2021, it was announced that the game would be moved to 2027.

On May 3, 2021, it was announced that Wisconsin would play a home and home series versus the Utah Utes in 2028 and 2033.

On June 7, 2021, it was announced that Wisconsin would play versus the Notre Dame Fighting Irish in 2026 at Lambeau Field, a game rescheduled from 2020 due to the COVID-19 pandemic.██ P5 opponents and equivalentsCurrent professional football players

 National Football League source:

 USFL 
Eric Burrell - Pittsburgh Maulers
Jon Dietzen - Pittsburgh Maulers
Garrett Groshek - Pittsburgh Maulers
Leon Jacobs - Michigan Panthers
Chris Orr - New Jersey Generals
Olive Sagapolu - Pittsburgh Maulers
Mason Stokke - Pittsburgh Maulers

 CFL 
Natrell Jamerson - Calgary Stampeders

 XFL 
Josh Seltzner - Seattle Sea Dragons

Notes

References

Further reading
 Haney, Richard Carlton. "Canceled Due to Racism: The Wisconsin Badger Football Games against Louisiana State in 1957 and 1958". Wisconsin Magazine of History'', vol. 92, no. 1 (Autumn 2008): 44–53.

External links

 

 
American football teams established in 1889
Badgers football